Welcome to the Neighborhood is an unaired American reality television series planned for broadcast by the American Broadcasting Company (ABC). The series was set to premiere on July 10, 2005, for a six-episode run, although it was abruptly removed from the ABC schedule only ten days before its planned broadcast. Filmed in Circle C Ranch in Austin, Texas, the series depicted a group of seven diverse families in competition for a $300,000 house in a suburban neighborhood. In order to win the house, the families were required to compete in weekly challenges to gain the approval of three conservative white families that reside in the neighborhood. The three neighborhood families eliminated a competing family each week, in which the final one remaining would be awarded the house and become residents of Circle C Ranch.

Welcome to the Neighborhood was met with backlash from advocacy groups, such as GLAAD, the Family Research Council (FRC), and the National Fair Housing Alliance (NFHA). Critics alleged that the series depicted intolerance toward minority groups and potentially violated the Fair Housing Act; the NFHA threatened to commence litigation against ABC if the series aired. On June 30, 2005, ABC shelved the series, citing "sensitivity of the subject matter". The producers, however, alleged that the cancellation was a business decision by The Walt Disney Company, ABC's owner, to wane controversy and thus maintain support among religious groups for The Chronicles of Narnia: The Lion, the Witch and the Wardrobe. ABC considered airing a condensed version of the series and Fox Reality Channel also offered to purchase the series' rights, however, both options were rejected. In 2007, the series was adapted by the German network RTL II, in which it ran for two seasons.

Format

Set in Circle C Ranch in Austin, Texas, the series depicted a group of seven families of various ethnicities, races, religions, sexual orientations, and lifestyles in competition for a $300,000 house in a suburban neighborhood. These competing families included a religious African American family (the Crenshaws); a Wiccan family (the Eckharts); a Latino family (the Gonzalezes); an Asian family (the Lees); a conservative white tattoo-covered family (the Sheets); a white gay couple with an adopted African American infant (the Wrights); and a family in which the mother is a stripper (the Morgans). The families were required to participate in a series of interviews, competitions, and social interactions, which were all judged by a panel of three conservative white families (the Stewarts, Daniels, and Bellamys) that reside in the neighborhood. The families in the neighborhood are "used to a certain kind of neighbor -- one who looks and thinks just like them", with the competitions allowing them an opportunity see the "common bonds" they hold with the competing families. Each week the neighbors eliminated one of the competing families in an effort to determine who should move into the neighborhood. Whichever family won the weekly competition, however, was given a "free pass" that exempted them from elimination that week. The family who remained at the end of the season was awarded the house and moved into Circle C Ranch.

Announcement and reception
Welcome to the Neighborhood was announced by ABC on April 27, 2005, as a summer replacement for Desperate Housewives. The network issued a press release which emphasized the traditional nature of the Circle C Ranch residents, who "are used to a certain kind of neighbor - one who looks and thinks just like them". The series was heavily promoted, with advertisements emphasizing the "nontraditional" nature of the competing families. In one of the commercials, Jim Stewart, the head of one of the three judging families, stated "I will not tolerate a homosexual couple coming into this neighborhood." The series' advertisements quickly drew criticism from media commentators and civil rights groups, who deemed the series as racist and homophobic.

Welcome to the Neighborhood drew sharp criticism from television critics and advocacy groups. Most television critics deemed the series to be an "embarrassing debacle", while advocacy groups, such as GLAAD, the Family Research Council (FRC), and the National Fair Housing Alliance (NFHA), believed it to be a cause for concern. Dalton Ross of Entertainment Weekly claimed the series lacked creativity, in which he stated that the first few episodes were "simply challenging to watch." GLAAD condemned the series' portrayal of intolerance toward gay men in the first few episodes and found the competition to be "unnecessarily cruel and insensitive". The organization, however, never called for cancellation of the series and believed that the producers had "admirable" intentions. The NFHA expressed concern that attributes such as race, religion, and sexual orientation were being used as factors in the awarding of a house, in which they alleged potential violations of the Fair Housing Act. Shanna Smith, the president and CEO of the NFHA, claimed that the group was prepared to commence litigation against ABC if the series were to air. The FRC voiced concern that evangelicals may be portrayed as "judgmental and foolish." The series also experienced backlash from right-wing activists, who claimed the show was "unbalanced" against conservatives.

Several families who resided in Circle C Ranch expressed their own frustrations with the negative reception the series garnered. John and Steve Wright, the gay couple with an adopted African-American son, ultimately won the series and moved into Circle C Ranch; the Wrights claimed that the series portrayed a gay couple in a positive light and they were "devastated" viewers would not witness this depiction. Stewart claimed the series' advertisements portrayed Circle C Ranch's residents as "one-dimensional characters", although a full viewing of the series added more depth to the neighborhood residents. Stewart further explained that the series allowed him to overcome his own homophobia and to reconnect with his estranged, gay son. Several Circle C Ranch residents expressed concern on online community bulletin boards that the series' negative press would tarnish the neighborhood's reputation and lower property values. According to Faye Rencher, a black woman who moved into Circle C Ranch shortly after the series' announcement, the advertisements "painted the neighborhood like they were these judgmental, upper-class, white suburban people". Rencher explained, however, that she found the neighborhood to be "real nice" and that she shared common ground with many families.

Cancellation
On June 30, 2005, ABC announced that it had shelved the series due to "sensitivity of the subject matter". A spokesperson defended the  network's intention to "confront preconceived notions" throughout the series, however, they acknowledged that the episodic nature of this process was potentially challenging to viewers. This announcement came only ten days before the series was set to air. Despite the fierce backlash the series received from advocacy groups, producers Bill and Eric Kennedy claimed that these protests had no impact on the series' cancellation; the producers claimed that ABC was "confident" it had legal standing to give away a house as a reward. Rather, the producers alleged that The Walt Disney Company, ABC's owner, shelved the series over fears that Evangelical Christians may boycott Disney's then-upcoming film The Chronicles of Narnia: The Lion, the Witch and the Wardrobe due to the series' portrayal of Evangelicals and gay men. The producers alleged that Disney sought to gather church support for Narnia after four religious groups had lifted longtime boycotts of the company, and the company feared Welcome to the Neighborhood could complicate religious support for the film. ABC spokesperson Kevin Brockman denied these claims, however, he acknowledged that the network's stated reasons for the series' cancellation were "unconvincing".

The cancellation of Welcome to the Neighborhood was met with mixed reactions from advocacy groups. Some groups such as the NHFA were "elated" over its cancellation, while others such as GLAAD expressed interest in the broadcast of a revised version of the series. ABC explored the idea of airing a condensed version of the series, which placed the "positive ending" in closer proximity to the "edgier" early episodes. Fox Reality Channel also reached out to ABC with an offer to broadcast the series, however, ABC rejected this proposition. In 2009, ABC claimed that the series may air. In October 2006, the Jay & Tony Show, one of the series' production companies, signed a seven-figure deal with Warner Horizon Television and announced their intentions to produce a new reality television show loosely inspired by Welcome to the Neighborhood. Producer Jay Blumenfield commented: "We wanted to take Welcome to the Neighborhood to the next level — and actually get it on the air." The series focused on "build[ing] an entire town from scratch", in which the audience would give input on how to build the town's community. This series, however, never came to fruition.

Adaptation
An adaptation of the series titled Willkommen in der Nachbarschaft (German; the English title is Welcome to the Neighborhood) aired in Germany on RTL II. The six-episode season premiered on October 1, 2007, and concluded on November 5, 2007. The series followed a diverse group of five families in competition for a house in Buckow, Berlin worth €250,000 (US$251,0923). The families included a man married to two separate women; two punks who own seven rats; a family with two children, two dogs, and a tarantula; a family in which one of the parents is transexual; and a family of ten from Palestine. Contrary to the original series, each episode of the adaptation individually focused on one of the five families living in the coveted house. Each family moved into the house on a trial basis, in which nine families residing in the neighborhood assessed how well each competing family integrated into the neighborhood. The neighbors also assigned the families tasks, such as landscaping or organizing street festivals in the neighborhood. At the end of the series, the nine judging families voted on which competing family should move into their neighborhood. The family with a transexual parent ultimately won the competition. The series generally received negative reception from television critics, with Uwe Felsenhauer of Die Welt referring to it as a "perfidious experiment". Frank Henkel, the Secretary General of the Christian Democratic Union, claimed that the series promoted racism. In Response, RTL II's program director Axel Kühn claimed that the series was never intended to discriminate against anyone. Despite this negative reception, the series was nominated at the 2008 Rose d'Or in the Reality category.

A second season premiered on August 26, 2008, which focused on five families competing for a house in Ruhr. The series was intended for a six-episode run, although it was cancelled after the broadcast of the third episode due to low ratings. German television presenter Aleksandra Bechtel was set to host the season's finale.

See also
 List of television series canceled before airing an episode

References

Sources

External links
  at the Wayback Machine
 

2000s American reality television series
American Broadcasting Company original programming
LGBT-related controversies in television
Race-related controversies in television
Religious controversies in television
Television controversies in the United States
Television series by MGM Television
Television shows set in Austin, Texas
Unaired television pilots
Unaired television shows